MotorStorm is a 2006 racing video game developed by Evolution Studios and published by Sony Computer Entertainment for the Sony PlayStation 3 computer entertainment system. Announced at E3 2005, the game was released in Japan on 14 December 2006 and worldwide in March 2007. MotorStorm has sold over 3 million copies. Two sequels were made, MotorStorm: Pacific Rift in 2008, and MotorStorm: Apocalypse in 2011. Another game was also created, MotorStorm: Arctic Edge, for the PlayStation 2 and PlayStation Portable. As of January 2012, the online multiplayer servers for the game have been permanently shut down.

Gameplay
The events of the game take place at the fictional MotorStorm Festival in Monument Valley. The objective of the game is to win a series of off-road races and to be the overall winner of the Festival. MotorStorm holds the Guinness World Record for the biggest variety of vehicles in a racing game - players are in control of seven different types of vehicles throughout the game: bikes, ATVs, buggies, rally cars, racing trucks, mudpluggers and big rigs. Each vehicle has its own strengths and weaknesses. For example, dirt bikes are capable of accelerating very fast and capable of maneuvering through tight spaces, but they are also easily damaged, and only reach mediocre top speeds. On the other hand, big rigs have great durability, medium speed, but poor acceleration and handling.

Each race requires the player to choose a particular vehicle type and often race against many of the other vehicles. Every track has many different ways of getting through it, each catering to a specific class of vehicle thereby making the racing field more even. The events in the game occur in real-time, such as the mud effects, tire marks, and crashes (for example, if a car loses a wheel, it will remain where it lands for the duration of the race). Each track is filled with a variety of jumps, bumps, cliffs, ledges, mud pits, parts from other cars, and other obstacles. Races are generally three-lap events with two to fifteen racers. There are nine playable tracks in the game with a further four, which were available to purchase as downloadable content through the PlayStation Store.

Tracks experience real-time deformation, which means each lap is different from the last; obstacles and other elements that are displaced from their original position will remain that way unless disturbed again. Larger vehicles can create large holes or leave ruts that can easily upset smaller, lighter vehicles, and every vehicle responds in different ways to different track environments. Vehicles like big rigs and mudpluggers get excellent traction in mud, whereas lighter vehicles like dirt bikes and ATVs will slip and slide.

Nitrous boost plays a large part in MotorStorm and is used to either catch up to opponents or pull away from them. Players must keep an eye on their boost meter, which shows how hot the car's engine is. The longer the boost is held, the hotter the engine becomes. If the boost is held when the engine reaches its critical temperature, it will explode. Since explosions resulting from the boost typically rocket the player's vehicle forward, they can be used to edge out another racer across the finish line. This can be very useful when behind, although this does not work all of the time if the AI opponent gains the upper hand.

In online play, Catch-up mode can be enabled. This means the leader of a race has less boost than everyone else, allowing players further back in the field to "catch-up". If the leader changes, so does the racer with less boost. This makes using boost for the leader a technical task, in theory they should only use it when necessary, and relying on their individual driving skills to win them the race.

Development

E3 video footage

Early details released by Sony and Evolution Studios show high-quality rendered video sequences. Many gaming enthusiasts and members of the press became sceptical as to the source of the material shown, with most people suspecting the footage to be pre-rendered as opposed to real-time in-game footage.

In March 2006, shortly following the Game Developers Conference, leaked footage of a tech demo was spread across the Internet on sites such as YouTube. The demo showed a yellow buggy and a motorbike both cutting through mud, as well as splashing the mud onto a white truck, and showed violent crashes, such as a bike landing on a purple rally car, causing it to spin out, and a white mud plugger ramming through the yellow buggy, causing it to get crushed by rolling over and crossing through flames and crashing into the guardrail. Being a technical demo, it did not show any gameplay aspects or whether the final game would reach the standard of the E3 2005 video. Sony representative Phil Harrison said it would make an appearance at E3 2006, which eventually did, although it missed the first day of the expo due to the show versions being completed and uploaded to LA that day. The build at the show was only 50% complete but still showed some effects such as motion blur and track deformation.

Demos
Two demo versions of the game have been made available to the public. The first was only available on PlayStation 3 retail kiosks, while the second was only available for download from the PlayStation Store. While both demos featured the same track, the kiosk demo allowed the player to switch vehicles on the grid before the race starts, which means that the player was able to race in approximately twenty different vehicles, while the downloadable demo restricted players to two vehicles. The downloadable demo had a smoother frame rate and extra visual detail.

Both demos allowed the player to steer using Sixaxis motion-sensing.

Downloadable content
In 2007, there were several add-ons and DLCs: first one, both in Europe
and North America, an add-on was made available on the PlayStation Network in June. This free download, when used in conjunction with the 1.2 update, unlocked a time-trial mode. In this mode, players were able to select a track and vehicle to race around and achieve the best time. When online, players could upload their best times to see where they rank in a global leaderboard. There was also the ability to download the "ghosts" of best laps of other players, including the creators and race against them.

Later in September in Europe, a second add-on was made available for purchase on the PlayStation Network, called the Coyote Revenge Weekend VIP Pass (named Revenge Weekend in North America). This download, when used in conjunction with the 2.0 update, unlocked the Coyote Weekend mode. This allowed players to access an additional three tickets, combining nine races (four races each in the first and second tickets and one final race in the third ticket). The races were unlocked sequentially and via player success in preceding races. The mode is called Coyote Weekend because the track Coyote Revenge features predominantly, and the races were presented as happening over a weekend festival over Saturday and Sunday. Out of the nine races, the Coyote Revenge track was featured five times, with various new routes and short-cuts. Four other tracks were also featured in the Coyote Weekend festival. The download also included two new vehicles, a bike, an ATV and a bonus vehicle that could be accessed on successful completion of the races. There was also a vehicle pack available on the PlayStation Network, that included a rally car which looks very similar to a DeLorean and a Big Rig which is based on a prison bus, and new livery skins known as Numskull Helmets and Big Blue Bunny.

Also in September in USA, a third add-on was made available which included a truck (known as the Castro Capitano, preceded by the Castro Robusto) with three styles. In October in Europe, a new Halloween livery was made available for download, on the Castro Robusto racing truck. Downloading this livery automatically unlocked the truck (but only for that livery, the others were to be unlocked by progressing in the Festival). The Devil's Weekend pack was released in Europe and North America in November 20 and contained The Devil's Crossing track, nine new races, four new vehicles and new liveries such as Crazy Samurai and QuickFoot liveries. In December in USA, it featured a new downloadable holiday skin for Castro Varadero (a big rig). Two tracks, Eagle's Nest and Diamondback Speedway were released in Europe and North America in January 2008. In North America and Europe, a Chinese New Year skin became available for download for the Wulff Revo rally car in February.

Despite the closure of the multiplayer servers in 2012, it was still possible to download the game updates, as they were required for DLC compatibility. While most PS3 games search for updates from the XMB or after starting them, this game required the user to enter the now-defunct online modes in order to trigger the updating process. The most recent update was version 3.1, but it is no longer officially available to download, despite the DLC being still available for purchase on the PlayStation Store. However, a workaround for both the multiplayer and the game updates download was found in November 2021.

PlayStation Home
In PlayStation Home in October 2009, a MotorStorm themed personal apartment was released to all four versions of Home, being Asia, Europe, Japan, and North America. The apartment was called the "MotorStorm Monument Valley Campsite" and could be purchased from the Home Estates store in Home's shopping complex. There were also sixteen MotorStorm themed furniture items that could be purchased to go along with the apartment, including a sofa constructed from a mangled skateboard, the clapped out car seat from one of the original MotorStorm vehicles and a smouldering barbecue cunningly fashioned from an old oil-drum and other nondescript pieces of junk. These were possible to purchase from the Furniture store in Home's shopping complex.

MotorStorm was featured at E3 2007 as fully supporting game launching in PlayStation Home, but was released without this feature. Its successor, MotorStorm: Pacific Rift, however, did fully support game launching in Home. Although it does not fully support the feature, it could still be game launched through the Universal Game Launching method which does not have all of the features of a game that would have full support for game launching.

Release
MotorStorm was officially released in Japan on 14 December 2006, where it became the best-selling PlayStation 3 game; and in March 2007 in North America and Europe, the latter as part of the European PlayStation 3 launch on 23 March. Both the North American and European versions include online play, which was not included in the Japanese version at the time of its release. Online play for Japan was released in an update on 20 June.

By 9 July 2007, MotorStorm had sold more than one million copies in North America.
As of October 2011 MotorStorm has sold 3.5 million copies worldwide.

Reception

MotorStorm has received positive reviews, it holds an average rating of 82/100 on Metacritic as of September 2007 and 82% on GameRankings. The game was selected as one of Gaming Target's "52 Games We'll Still Be Playing From 2007. On the 11th annual interactive achievement award MotorStorm won racing game of the year. GameSpot praised the games online aspect saying "Motorstorm's rampageous brand of racing is a great deal of fun" as well as the graphics and soundtrack of the game while noting its lack of offline multiplayer and its single-player mode.

IGN summed up its review by saying that "it may be shallow, but it's also the most engaging racing experience you'll find anywhere", but expressed its excitement in the potential of its sequel due to the strong foundations the original laid out. However, GameTrailers criticized the AI of the game saying it was based on a "rubber-band" principle which allowed computer drivers to easily catch up with the player regardless of the player's performance, but praised the online gameplay of MotorStorm as well as its gameplay physics.

MotorStorm received a "Platinum" sales award from the Entertainment and Leisure Software Publishers Association (ELSPA), indicating sales of at least 300,000 copies in the United Kingdom.

References

2006 video games
Pack-in video games
PlayStation 3-only games
MotorStorm
Inactive multiplayer online games
Sony Interactive Entertainment games
Video games developed in the United Kingdom
Video games set in Colorado
Video games using Havok
Multiplayer and single-player video games
PlayStation 3 games
Products and services discontinued in 2012
D.I.C.E. Award for Racing Game of the Year winners
Evolution Studios games